Heart and Soul is a box set by English rock band Joy Division containing nearly every track the band recorded between 1977 and 1980. The first two discs contain almost their entire studio output, including the albums Unknown Pleasures and Closer, along with singles and compilation appearances. Discs three and four collect rare demos and live recordings, many of which were previously unreleased. All tracks are digitally remastered. It reached #70 in the UK.

Track listing
All songs written by Ian Curtis, Bernard Sumner, Peter Hook and Stephen Morris.

Disc one: Unknown Pleasures Plus
"Digital" – 2:53
"Glass" – 3:56
"Disorder" – 3:31
"Day of the Lords" – 4:49
"Candidate" – 3:05
"Insight" – 4:28
"New Dawn Fades" – 4:48
"She's Lost Control" – 3:56
"Shadowplay" – 3:55
"Wilderness" – 2:38
"Interzone" – 2:16
"I Remember Nothing" – 5:56
"Ice Age" – 2:25
"Exercise One" – 3:08
"Transmission" – 3:37
"Novelty" – 4:01
"The Kill" – 2:16
"The Only Mistake" – 4:19
"Something Must Break" – 2:53
"Autosuggestion" – 6:10
"From Safety to Where...?" – 2:27

Notes
All tracks previously released.
Tracks 1 and 2 recorded in October 1978 at Cargo Studios, Rochdale. First released on the A Factory Sample EP in 1978.
Tracks 3 to 12 recorded in April 1979 at Strawberry Studios, Stockport. First released as the entire Unknown Pleasures album in 1979.
Track 13 recorded in October/November 1979 at Cargo Studios, Rochdale, during sessions for the Licht und Blindheit single. First released in the Still album in 1981.
Tracks 14, 17 and 18 recorded in April 1979 at Strawberry Studios, during sessions for the Unknown Pleasures album. First released in the Still album in 1981.
Tracks 15 and 16 recorded in July/August 1979 at Strawberry Studios. First released as the "Transmission" single in 1979.
Track 19 recorded in July/August 1979 at Central Sound Studios, Manchester, during sessions for the "Transmission" single. First released in the Still album in 1981.
Tracks 20 and 21 recorded in April 1979 at Strawberry Studios, during sessions for the Unknown Pleasures album. First released on the Earcom 2: Contradiction EP in 1979.

Disc two: Closer Plus
"She's Lost Control" (12" version) – 4:57
"Sound of Music" – 3:55
"Atmosphere" – 4:11
"Dead Souls" – 4:57
"Komakino" – 3:54
"Incubation" – 2:52
"Atrocity Exhibition" – 6:05
"Isolation" – 2:52
"Passover" – 4:46
"Colony" – 3:55
"A Means to an End" – 4:07
"Heart and Soul" – 5:51
"Twenty Four Hours" – 4:26
"The Eternal" – 6:07
"Decades" – 6:13
"Love Will Tear Us Apart" – 3:27
"These Days" – 3:26

Notes
All tracks previously released.
Track 1 recorded in March 1980 at Strawberry Studios, Stockport. First released on "Atmosphere" single in 1980.
Track 2 recorded in January 1980 at Pennine Sound Studios, Oldham, during sessions for the "Love Will Tear Us Apart" single. First released on the Still album in 1981.
Tracks 3 and 4 recorded in October/November 1979 at Cargo Studios, Rochdale. First released as the Licht und Blindheit single in 1980.
Tracks 5 and 6 recorded in March 1980 at Britannia Row Studios, Islington, during the sessions for the Closer album. First released on the "Komakino" single in 1980.
Tracks 7 to 15 recorded in March 1980 at Britannia Row Studios, Islington. First released as the entire Closer album in 1980.
Track 16 recorded in March 1980 at Strawberry Studios, Stockport. First released on "Love Will Tear Us Apart" single in 1980.
Track 17 recorded in January 1980 at Pennine Sound Studios, Oldham. First released on "Love Will Tear Us Apart" single in 1980.

Disc three: Rarities
"Warsaw" – 2:26
"No Love Lost" – 3:42
"Leaders of Men" – 2:34
"Failures" – 3:44
"The Drawback" (Demo) – 1:46
"Interzone" (Demo) – 2:11
"Shadowplay" (Demo) – 4:10
"Exercise One" (Peel Session) – 2:28
"Insight" (Demo) – 4:05
"Glass" (Demo) – 3:29
"Transmission" (Demo) – 3:51
"Dead Souls" (Outtake) – 4:55
"Something Must Break" (Rough Mix)  – 2:53
"Ice Age" (Demo) – 2:36
"Walked in Line" (Rough Mix) – 2:46
"These Days" (Piccadilly Radio Session) – 3:27
"Candidate" (Piccadilly Radio Session) – 1:57
"The Only Mistake" (Piccadilly Radio Session) – 3:43
"Chance (Atmosphere)" (Piccadilly Radio Session) – 4:54
"Love Will Tear Us Apart" (Peel Session) – 3:22
"Colony" (Peel Session) – 4:03
"As You Said" – 2:01
"Ceremony" (Demo) – 4:57
"In a Lonely Place (Detail)" (Demo) – 2:26

Notes
Contains 14 tracks previously unreleased.
Tracks 1 to 4 recorded in December 1977 at Pennine Sound Studios, Oldham. First released as the An Ideal for Living EP in 1978.
Tracks 5 to 7 recorded in May 1978 at Arrow Studios for the unreleased album ("RCA demo"). Previously unreleased.
Track 8 recorded in January 1979 at the BBC Studios, Maida Vale, London. Previously released on The Peel Sessions in 1986.
Tracks 9, 10, 11 and 14 recorded in March 1979 at Eden Studios, London, during a one-day demo session. Previously unreleased.
Tracks 12 and 13 recorded in July 1979 at Central Sound Studios, Manchester, during sessions for the "Transmission" single. Previously unreleased.
Track 15 recorded in April 1979 at Strawberry Studios, Stockport, during sessions for Unknown Pleasures album. A re-mixed version of this recording was released on the Still album in 1981.
Tracks 16 to 19 recorded in June 1979 at Pennine Sound Studios, Oldham, during a session for Piccadilly Radio. Previously unreleased.
Tracks 20 and 21 recorded in November 1979 at the BBC Studios, Maida Vale. First released on The Peel Sessions in 1987.
Track 22 recorded in March 1980 at Britannia Row Studios, Islington. First released on the "Komakino" single in 1980.
Track 23 recorded on 14 May 1980 at Graveyard Studios, Prestwich.
Track 24 taken from an April 1980 rehearsal tape salvaged by Peter Hook.  Tracks 23 and 24 later recorded and released by New Order on "Ceremony" single in 1981.

Disc four: Live
"Dead Souls" (live) – 4:17
"The Only Mistake" (live) – 4:04
"Insight" (live) – 3:48
"Candidate" (live) – 2:03
"Wilderness" (live) – 2:27
"She's Lost Control" (live) – 3:38
"Disorder" (live) – 3:12
"Interzone" (live) – 2:03
"Atrocity Exhibition" (live) – 5:52
"Novelty" (live) – 4:27
"Autosuggestion" (live) – 4:05
"I Remember Nothing" (live) – 5:53
"Colony" (live) – 3:53
"These Days" (live) – 3:38
"Incubation" (live) – 3:36
"The Eternal" (live) – 6:33
"Heart and Soul" (live) – 4:56
"Isolation" (live) – 3:09
"She's Lost Control" (live) – 5:30

Notes
All tracks previously unreleased.
Tracks 1 to 10 recorded on 13 July 1979 at the Factory, Manchester.
Track 11 recorded on 2 August 1979 at the YMCA, London.
Tracks 12 to 14 recorded on 2 Nov 1979 at the Winter Gardens, Bournemouth.
Tracks 15 to 19 recorded on 29 February 1980 at the Lyceum, London.

Missing tracks
The following recordings were not included on Heart and Soul:
 Five tracks of the very first demo session in July 1977 at Pennine Sound Studios, Oldham, when the band was still called Warsaw: "Inside the Line", "Gutz", "At a Later Date", "The Kill" and "You're No Good for Me". First released on the Warsaw album in 1994.
 Live track "At a Later Date" recorded in October 1977 at the Electric Circus, Manchester. First released on the Short Circuit EP in 1978.
 Eight more tracks from the unreleased RCA album sessions in May 1978 at Arrow Studios, Manchester: "Leaders of Men", "Walked in Line", "Failures", "Novelty", "No Love Lost", "Transmission", "Ice Age" and "Warsaw". First released on the Warsaw album in 1994.
 Three more tracks from the first Peel Session in January 1979: "Insight", "Transmission" and "She's Lost Control". First released on The Peel Sessions in 1986.
 Additional track "Digital" from the demo-session in March 1979 at Eden Studios, London. Remains unreleased.
 The re-mixed version of "Walked in Line" which was released on the Still album in 1981.
 Additional track "Atrocity Exhibition" from the Piccadilly Radio session in June 1979 at Pennine Sound Studios, Oldham. Remains unreleased.
 Two more tracks from the first session for the "Transmission" single at Central Sound Studios, Manchester, in July 1979: "Transmission" and "Novelty". The recordings of the same songs from a second session in the same month were released as the single. The two tracks from the first session remain unreleased.
 Two live tracks from a TV appearance on BBC2's Something Else in September 1979: "Transmission" and "She's Lost Control". First released on Joy Division The Complete BBC Recordings in 2000.
 Two more tracks from the second Peel Session in November 1979: "The Sound of Music" and "Twenty Four Hours". First released on The Peel Sessions in 1987.
 The B-side version of "Love Will Tear Us Apart", recorded in January 1980 at Pennine Sound Studios, Oldham. First released on the Love Will Tear Us Apart single in 1980.
 Live track "Sister Ray" a Velvet Underground cover, from a concert at the Moonlight Club, West Hampstead on 2 April 1980, released on Still in 1981.
 Eleven live tracks from Birmingham University, recorded 2 May 1980, first released on Still in 1981.
 The live tracks released on the live albums Preston 28 February 1980 in 1999 and Les Bains Douches 18 December 1979 in 2001.
 Live tracks "Shadowplay" and "Transmission", recorded 13 July 1979 at the Factory, Manchester. "Transmission" was first released on the CD format of the re-release of the "Atmosphere" single in 1988. "Shadowplay" was not released until the 2007 reissue of Unknown Pleasures which also contains "Transmission".
 Live tracks "Love Will Tear Us Apart" and "Glass", recorded at the Moonlight Club, West Hampstead, which appear on the test pressing of the bonus disc for the 2007 reissue of Unknown Pleasures, but not on the issued disc. The tracks are probably from the concert on 2 April 1980, at which the cover of "Sister Ray" which appears on Still was recorded.
 Twelve live tracks from the University of London, recorded 8 February 1980, not released until the 2007 reissue of Closer.
 Eight live tracks and six sound check tracks from the High Wycombe Town Hall (not to be confused with the High Hall at Birmingham University), not released until the 2007 reissue of Still.
 The full-length studio recording of "In a Lonely Place", not released until Record Store Day 2011 as part of a double B-side to a double A-side 12" vinyl reissue of the New Order version of "Ceremony".

Release history

References 

Joy Division compilation albums
Albums produced by Martin Hannett
1997 compilation albums
London Records compilation albums
Rhino Records compilation albums
1997 live albums
Rhino Records live albums
London Records live albums
Joy Division live albums